Deslongchampsina is an extinct genus of machimosaurid crocodyliform from the Middle Jurassic (Bathonian) Cornbrash Formation of England and France, possibly from the Calcaire de Caen. The type and only known species is D. larteti, which was variously referred to Teleosaurus and the wastebasket taxon Steneosaurus before its distinction was formally recognised in 2019. Its snout was not as elongated as some other teleosauroids (mesorostrine), and the shape of its jaws and teeth suggest that it was a generalist predator, unlike the more powerful contemporary machimosaurin Yvridiosuchus.

References

Thalattosuchians
Prehistoric pseudosuchian genera
Prehistoric marine crocodylomorphs
Middle Jurassic crocodylomorphs
Bathonian life
Middle Jurassic reptiles of Europe
Fossils of England
Fossils of France
Fossil taxa described in 1866
Fossil taxa described in 2019